WIOK (107.5 FM) is an American radio station in Falmouth, Kentucky.  The station plays a Southern Gospel format.  The station is owned and operated by the Hammond Broadcasting, Inc.  It broadcasts with an effective radiated power of 6,000 watts in southern Pendleton County, Kentucky.  The station's range covers the corridor between Cincinnati, Ohio and Lexington, Kentucky.

External links

IOK
1981 establishments in Kentucky
Southern Gospel radio stations in the United States
IOK
Falmouth, Kentucky